Seasoned Veteran is the third studio album by American rapper Richie Rich. It was released November 5, 1996 on Def Jam Recordings, and to date is the only major label release for the artist. The album was produced by Ali Malik, DJ Daryl, Doug Rasheed, Jermaine Dupri, Lev Berlak, Mike Mosley, Richie Rich and Rick Rock. It peaked at number 11 on the Billboard Top R&B/Hip-Hop Albums and at number 35 on the Billboard 200. Two of the singles released, "Let's Ride" and "Do G's Get To Go To Heaven?", both appeared on multiple Billboard singles charts. The album features guest performances by 2Pac, E-40, Luniz, D'wayne Wiggins, T-Boz, and Rame Royal of Rhythm & Green.

Along with the single, a music video was produced for the song, "Let's Ride". A second single, "Do G's Get To Go To Heaven?", was also released as a music video, featuring Bo-Roc, and is dedicated to the memory of Tupac Shakur.

In the song "Niggas Done Changed" Feat. Tupac, 2Pac predicts his own death by saying “I been shot and murdered, can't tell you how it happened, word for word / But best believe niggas gonna get what they deserve.”

Critical reception 

The Source – "...Seasoned Veteran is one of the few albums available in the reality rap genre that lives up to its name and comes close to meeting the listener's expectations..."

Track listing

Samples
Fresh Out
"For the Love of Money" by The O'Jays
Let's Ride
"(Not Just) Knee Deep" by Funkadelic
Pillow
"(Lay Your Head on My) Pillow" by Tony! Toni! Toné!

Chart history 
Album

Singles

Personnel 

Richie Rich - vocals, producer, assistant producer, executive producer
Tina Davis - producer, assistant producer, executive producer, project supervisor
Kevin "Lipper" Washington - producer, assistant producer, executive producer
2Pac - vocals
Bo-Roc - background vocals
D'wayne Wiggins - guitar, background vocals
E-40 - vocals
Jermaine Dupri - producer, background vocals
Luniz - vocals
Simply E - background vocals

T-Boz - vocals
Ali Malik - producer
DJ Daryl - producer, assistant producer
Lev Berlak - producer, assistant producer
Rick Rock - producer
Joseph "Amp" Fiddler - keyboards, bass
Dorothy Low - photography
The Drawing Board - design
John "Indo" Neilson - engineer, mixing
Darren "Digital D" Harris - engineer, mixing
Joseph "Amp" Fiddler  - keyboards
Femi Ojtune  - keyboards
Phil Tan - mixing

References

External links 
[ Seasoned Veteran] at Allmusic
Seasoned Veteran at Discogs
Seasoned Veteran at MusicBrainz
Seasoned Veteran at Tower Records

Richie Rich (rapper) albums
1996 albums
Albums produced by Jermaine Dupri
Albums produced by Rick Rock
Def Jam Recordings albums
Gangsta rap albums by American artists